Wolfsheim can refer to:

 Wolfsheim, Germany, a village south-west of Mainz, Germany
 Wolfsheim (band), a synthpop band from Hamburg, Germany
 Meyer Wolfsheim (sometimes spelled "Wolfshiem"), a character in F. Scott Fitzgerald's The Great Gatsby

See also
 Wolfisheim, a commune in the Bas-Rhin department, France